The McConnell River Migratory Bird Sanctuary is located in the Kivalliq Region of Nunavut, Canada.  The 32,800 hectare sanctuary is on Hudson Bay's west coast, 27 km south of Arviat, and 50 km north of the Manitoba border. Its namesake is the McConnell River which flows to the Hudson Bay. The Bird Sanctuary is home to and an important breeding ground for cackling goose, lesser snow goose, Ross's goose, and Canada goose.

Established in 1960 under the Migratory Bird Sanctuary Regulations of the Migratory Birds Convention Act of 1917, the sanctuary is privately owned by the Inuit of Nunavut. It received Ramsar Convention designation May 24, 1982, making it Canada's 14th Ramsar site.

See also
 List of Migratory Bird Sanctuaries of Canada
 Migratory Bird Treaty Act of 1918

References

Further reading
 Snow geese and blue geese at McConnell River Migratory Bird Sanctuary, 1977. [S.l.]: G. Swinton, 1977.

External links
 Environment Canada website

Ramsar sites in Kivalliq Region
Parks in Kivalliq Region
Bird sanctuaries of Kivalliq Region
Migratory Bird Sanctuaries of Canada
Protected areas established in 1960
1960 establishments in the Northwest Territories